The Chinese elm cultivar Ulmus parvifolia 'Chessins' is a compact lacebark elm used in landscaping.

Description
It is simply known as a medium tree.

Pests and diseases
The species and its cultivars are highly resistant, but not immune, to Dutch elm disease, and unaffected by the elm leaf beetle Xanthogaleruca luteola.

Accessions

North America
None known

Europe
 Brighton & Hove City Council, UK. NCCPG Elm Collection.
 Sir Harold Hillier Gardens, UK. Acc. no. 1978.0869

References

Chinese elm cultivar
Ulmus articles missing images
Ulmus